Finswimming at the 2009 Asian Indoor Games was held in Mỹ Đình National Aquatics Sports Complex, Hanoi, Vietnam from 31 October to 2 November 2009.

Medalists

Men

Women

Medal table

Results

Men

50 m surface
1 November

100 m surface
31 October

200 m surface
2 November

400 m surface
1 November

800 m surface
2 November

100 m bi-fins
1 November

4 × 100 m surface relay
2 November

4 × 200 m surface relay
31 October

Women

50 m surface
1 November

100 m surface
31 October

200 m surface
2 November

400 m surface
1 November

800 m surface
31 October

100 m bi-fins
1 November

4 × 100 m surface relay
31 October

4 × 200 m surface relay
2 November

References

External links
 Official site

2009 Asian Indoor Games events
Asian Indoor Games
Finswimming at multi-sport events